Shürhozelie Liezietsu (born 20 November 1936) is an Indian politician from Nagaland in Northeast India who served as the 11th Chief Minister of Nagaland from 22 February 2017 to 19 July 2017. He is the  president of Naga People's Front.

Early life 
Shürhozelie Liezietsu was born on 20 November 1936 in Kohima Village to an Angami Naga family. He did his initial schooling in Mission Public School, Kohima and completed his matriculation in year 1956  from Kohima Government High School. He completed his graduation from the prestigious St. Edmund's College, Shillong. He started his career as a clerk in state secretariat before switching to teaching. He also has an interest in gardening apart from writing and politics. He was also President of Ura Academy, the state's highest literary body and was conferred an honorary D.Litt. by the Nagaland University in year 2003.

Political career 
He entered politics in year 1969 and was one of the founding members of Nagaland's first regional party United Democratic Front (UDF) and later Naga National Democratic Party (NNDP). In 2002 he was crucial in the formation of Nagaland's People Front (NPF). In 2003 he was elected to the Nagaland Legislative Assembly as the Naga People's Front candidate in the constituency Northern Angami-I (ST). After the election, he was appointed Minister for Urban Development.

He retained his constituency in the 2008 election, and was then appointed Minister for Urban Development for a second time with an additional portfolio of Higher and Technical Education.

He voluntarily did not contest the 2013 State Assembly election and remained as Chairman of the Democratic Alliance of Nagaland with cabinet status and allowed his son Khriehu Liezietsu to successfully contest the election. Khriehu Liezietsu was later inducted as Advisor for Youth Resources and Sports and Music Task Force.

He is also one of the founding members of the first regional party in Nagaland (UDF, later NDP and presently Naga People's Front). He has been Member of Legislative Assembly (MLA) eight times and held several important portfolios in a political career spanning nearly five decades. On 22 February 2017 he was sworn in as 17th Chief Minister of Nagaland. He is one of the most decorated educationists in Angami language literature and has authored more than 40 books on poetry, novels, history, drama, translations and several of his books are part of syllabus in Nagaland University.

References 

|-

Naga People's Front politicians
Living people
1936 births
People from Kohima district
People from Kohima
Chief ministers from Naga People's Front politicians
Chief Ministers of Nagaland
Nagaland MLAs 2003–2008
Nagaland MLAs 2008–2013
Nagaland MLAs 1969–1974
Nagaland MLAs 1974–1975
Nagaland MLAs 1977–1982
Nagaland MLAs 1982–1987
Nagaland MLAs 1987–1988
Nagaland MLAs 1993–1998